Lovebox is Beni's fifth studio album, and second original album under the mononym Beni released through Nayutawave Records. It was released on June 2, 2010. Natuyawave describes the album as "fully loaded with different feelings of love: happy love, painful love..."

Background
The album was released only nine months after her debut album with Nayutawave, Bitter & Sweet. Bitter & Sweet is the most successful of Beni's career, it being certified gold by the RIAJ (her only album to receive a certification).

Singles
"Sign", released January 20, 2010, was the first single from the album. "Sign" samples Yumi Matsutoya's number-one hit, . The single charted at number 50 on the Oricon single chart. On the Billboard Japan Hot 100 the single peaked at number 96.

The second single released was "Bye Bye", on March 10, 2010. "Bye Bye" peaked at number 57 on the Oricon charts and is the lowest ranking single from the album.

The third single, "Yurayura/Gimme Gimme" was released May 5, 2010. "Yurayura/Gimme Gimme" saw more success than the other two singles. The single peaked at number 20 on the Oricon charts, becoming her first Top 20 single since "Mō Nido to...". "Yurayura" was also her highest charting single on the Japan Hot 100, ranking in at #25.

Promotion
Beni created a limited edition frozen yogurt for frozen yogurt chain RazzleBerry, called The Okinawan. She appeared at the Shibuya store on May the 15th for half an hour, acting as the store manager and selling the frozen yogurt to customers. The promotion was documented over three episodes on the late night TV show Future Tracks R.

One of the songs from the album, "Kimi ja Nakya," was released as a ringtone two weeks before the album's release date.

Track listing

Personnel

Recording personnel

 3rd Productions - production (#3, #14)
 Beni - lyrics (#2-4, #6-7, #10-15), music (#13, #15)
 D.O.I. - mixing (#2, #5, #7, #9-12)
 Shoko Fujibayashi - lyrics (#5, #9)
 Shigeki "Crystal" Fujino - mastering
 Daisuke "D.I" Imai - arrangement (#1-2, #4-6, #8-12), chorus (#10), instruments (#1, #4-6, #9-11), lyrics (#5), mixing (#1), music (#1-2, #4-6, #9-12), production (#1-2, #4-6, #8-12, #15), programming (#2), recording (#1)
 Gen Ittetsu - string arrangement (#2-3, #8, #15)
 Jamosa - lyrics (#6)
 Shohei Katsuya - assistant engineer (#15)
 Kgro for Gidz, inc. - recording (#7)
 Yoko Kuzuya - lyrics, music, piano (#8)
 Lil' Showy - lyrics, instruments, music (#7)

 Hiroyuki Matsugashita - piano/piano arrangement (#15)
 Yumi Matsutoya - music (#3)
 Kaneko Mitsuyasu - recording (#4, #6, #14), mixing (#3-4, #6, #14-15)
 Tomohiro Murata - recording (#10-13)
 Manabu Ohta - recording (#2, #5, #8-9)
 Satoshi Sasamoto - recording (#15), string recording (#8)
 Shingo.S - instruments (#3, #14)
 STY for Digz, inc. - production (#7)
 Yo Taira - lyrics (#7)
 Shinsaku Takane - recording (#3)
 Kenichiro Wada - guitar (#8)
 Naoki Yamada - mixing (#8, #13)
 Yanagiman - music (#13), arrangement/production (#13), instruments (#13)
 Masataka Yoshino - lyrics (#3, #15), music (#3, #15)

Other personnel

 Seiichi Hibi - sales promotion manager
 Akira Kitajima - photography
 Susumu Machida - executive producer
 Hideki Nakano - media promotion manager
 Keiko Nakatani - hair, make-up
 Issey Nisawa - A&R
 Sakura Nishimura - digital marketing
 Shun Odagiri - artist management
 Takashi Oguni - visual producer
 Nami Sasaki - product management
 Shino Suganuma - styling

 Yasushi Suzuki - props
 Ikue Takahashi - art direction, design
 Toshiyuki Takano - A&R supervisor, head of media promotion
 Kazumasa Takase - head of product management, marketing supervisor
 Koshino Taketomi - sales promotion
 Mariko Takita - visual coordination
 Akira Terabayashi - executive producer
 Takashi Yamaguchi - digital marketing
 Masataka Yoshino - artist management, general producer
 Yasuaki Zushi - artwork coordination

References

External links 
 Lovebox special website 

2010 albums
Beni (singer) albums
Japanese-language albums